Edling is a Swedish surname. Notable people with the surname include:

Dina Edling (1854–1935), Swedish opera singer
Leif Edling (born 1963), songwriter and bass player of the Swedish doom metal band Candlemass
Rolf Edling (born 1943), Swedish fencer

Swedish-language surnames